Delica Landry (born 19 November 1977), better known by his stage name Dry, is a French rapper of Congolese origin. He is also known by the aliases "L'Amiral" and "L'Intransférable".

Landry Delica grew up in Sevran in Seine-Saint-Denis, outside of Paris, where he was friends with the rapper Nessbeal before moving in 1991 to Orly in the Val-de-Marne.

In addition to his solo work, Dry is a member of French rap group Intouchable alongside band member Demon One (real name Hakim Sid). He is also part of the French rap collective Mafia K-1 Fry (sometimes stylized as Mafia K'1 Fry) alongside the other Intouchable member Demon One. Intouchable, Dry and Demon One had a lot of collaborations with other members of the collective.

As member of Mafia K-1 Fry, Dry took part in albums by rappers Ideal J, Rohff and 113 before releasing with Intouchable the 2000 album Les points sur les I. In 2004, he took part in the third album Rohff La fierté des nôtres and in the compilation Street Lourd Hall Stars with "La hass" featuring Kamelancien, de Bicêtre -94-, and Rohff. In 2005, Intouchable released their second album La vie de rêve with a joint title "La gagne" featuring Tonton David. Dry has also been featured on a number of Sexion d'Assaut rap band.

In 2008, Dry had his debut solo album as a street tape entitled De la pure pour les durs including many unreleased tracks of Dry. In 2009, he released his debut studio album Les derniers seront les premiers followed up by a second solo studio album on 20 February 2012 called Tôt ou tard.

Discography

Albums / Mixtapes 
Solo 

As part of Intouchable
2000 : Les points sur les I
2001 : I Have a Dream (maxi)
2004 : Original Mix-Tape (mixtape)
2005 : La vie de rêve

In collective Mafia K'1 Fry
1997 : Les liens sacrés
1999 : Légendaire
2003 : La cerise sur le ghetto
2007 : Jusqu'à la mort

Singles

*Did not appear in the official Belgian Ultratop 50 charts, but rather in the bubbling under Ultratip charts. For Ultratip peaks, added 50 positions to arrive at an equivalent Ultratop position

Featured in 

*Did not appear in the official Belgian Ultratop 50 charts, but rather in the bubbling under Ultratip charts. For Ultratip peaks, added 50 positions to arrive at an equivalent Ultratop position

Appearances
Main
2003: Dry - "Freestyle" on mixtape Pur son ghetto Vol. 2
2003: Dry feat Rohff, Sefyu & Zesau - Baiser sur la compile Talents fachés 1
2006: Dry feat Singuila - "Coup du sort" in the compilation Street couleur
2008: Dry feat Belly Blanco - "Je suis l'un d'eux" in the compilation Département 94
2009: Dry feat AP, Selim Du 9.4 & OGB - "J'ai la rime" in the compilation Les yeux dans la banlieue Vol. 2

Featured in
1996: Ideal J feat Dry, Rohff, Rim-K & Manu Key - "Show Bizness" in Ideal J EP Original Mc's sur une mission
2007: Rim'K feat Dry & Medine - "Le billet de banque" in Rim'K album Famille nombreuse
2008: Kery James feat Dry - "Egotripes" in the Kery James album A l'ombre du show business
2008: 3ème Prototype feat Dry - "Normal" on the Street CD of 3e Prototype, Le renouveau
2008: Gooki feat Dry & S'Co - "J'ai fait un rêve" in the Gooki album Trop de choses à dire
2009: Kennedy feat Dry, Ol Kainry, Seth Gueko, Black Barby, Despo Rutti & Alonzo - "Code de la rue Remix" in the Kennedy album Cicatrice
2009: AP feat Dry & OGB - "Tempéraments" in the AP album Discret
2009: Sexion d'Assaut feat Dry - "Wati bon son" in the Street CD of Sexion D'assaut L'écrasement de tête
2010: Mister You feat Dry, John Steed & Wira - "Vieille meuf" in the Mister You album  Présumé coupable
2010: 400 Hyènes feat Dry, Zesau, Alpha 5.20, Iron Sy & Beli Blanco - "Union malsaine" in the 400 Hyènes album L'esprit du clan
2010: Sexion d'Assaut feat Dry - "Wati by night" in the Sexion d'assaut album L'école des points vitaux
2010: Ol Kainry feat Dry - "Beleck" in the Ol Kainry album Au max 2.0

References

External links
SkyRock Dry page
https://web.archive.org/web/20140714183117/http://www.mafiak1fry.fr/

1977 births
Living people
French rappers
French people of Republic of the Congo descent
Rappers from Val-de-Marne